Agence Nationale de l'Aviation Civil may refer to:
Agence Nationale de l'Aviation Civil (Gabon)
Agence Nationale de l'Aviation Civil (Niger)

See also
Agence nationale de l'aviation civile (disambiguation)
National Civil Aviation Agency